The Leeuwin Estate Concert Series are annual open-air events featuring international and Australian performers at Leeuwin Estate Winery.

History

The first concert was a performance from the London Philharmonic Orchestra in 1985, with the Australian tour underwritten by Leeuwin Estate owners Denis and Tricia Horgan on the condition that the orchestra play at Leeuwin Estate. Hosting the concert was considered a risk due to the physically remote location of the Margaret River, being 260 kilometres from the state capital of Perth. Friends tried to talk the Horgans out of the idea, but they went ahead and the concert was a great success, with 5000 people attending and the event attracting international coverage.

The next two concerts also featured orchestras, with the Berlin Staatskapelle performing in 1986 and the Royal Danish Orchestra in 1987. In 1988 the series featured its first individual star, when the Chicago Symphony Orchestra could not attend and instead Ray Charles was brought in to perform with the West Australian Symphony Orchestra. The West Australian Symphony Orchestra has featured eight further times since accompanying other musicians.

In 1990 Leeuwin Estate hosted Dame Kiri Te Kanawa, with other stars Diana Ross and Tom Jones performing in 1992 and 1993 respectively. 1993 also saw the first iteration of the "Australian Family Concert" series featuring Australian performers at a separate event each year.

In February 2005, a concert was performed by Sting that drew an audience of 6,000 and raised over $4 million for the 2004 Indian Ocean earthquake and tsunami relief efforts after Sting had to cancel a scheduled concert in Sri Lanka due to the disaster.

The 26th year of the series in 2010 saw Boz Scaggs & Michael McDonald perform in front of a sold-out crowd of 6500 people.

The concert has become a major tourism draw for the Margaret River and Western Australia. Denis Horgan was awarded with a Centenary Medal and both he and Tricia Horgan were inducted as Members of the Order of Australia in 2001 for services to tourism in Western Australia.

Leeuwin Concert Series

The following is a list of the performers and the year of the concert.

Australian Family Concerts

The following is a list of performers and years as part of the annual Australian Family Concerts.

References

External links
Leeuwin Estate – Concerts and Events

Concerts
Recurring events established in 1985